The 2014–15 Northeastern Huskies women's basketball team represents the Northeastern University during the 2014–15 NCAA Division I women's basketball season. The Huskies, led by first year head coach Kelly Cole, play their home games at the Cabot Center and were members of the Colonial Athletic Association. They finished the season 4–25, 1–17 in CAA play to finish in last place. They lost in the first round of the CAA women's tournament to Delaware.

Roster

Schedule

|-
!colspan=9 style="background:#CC0000; color:#000000;"| Regular season

|-
!colspan=9 style="background:#CC0000; color:#000000;"| 2015 CAA Tournament

See also
2014–15 Northeastern Huskies men's basketball team

References

Northeastern Huskies women's basketball seasons
Northeastern